ETG or EtG may refer to:

Businesses and organisations
 EtherCAT Technology Group
 Eural Trans Gas, a defunct Hungarian energy company
 Evian Thonon Gaillard F.C., a defunct French football club

Medicine
 Electrotrichogenesis
 Ethyl glucuronide, a metabolite of ethanol

Other uses
 Enter the Gungeon
 Elément à Turbine à Gaz, a French turbotrain